Lenard Joseph Gustafson, PC (November 10, 1933 – March 18, 2022) was a Canadian politician from Saskatchewan. Gustafson served in the Senate of Canada and House of Commons of Canada.

Born in Macoun, Saskatchewan, Gustafson was a farmer, contractor and businessman, before he was elected to the House of Commons of Canada in the 1979 general election as the Progressive Conservative Member of Parliament for Assiniboia, Saskatchewan. He did not serve in the short-lived government led by Prime Minister Joe Clark.

He was re-elected in 1980, 1984, and 1988. Gustafson served as parliamentary secretary to Prime Minister Brian Mulroney from 1984 until shortly before Mulroney left office. In May 1993, shortly before his retirement, Mulroney appointed Gustafson to the Senate of Canada, where he sat as a Progressive Conservative and, since February 2004, as a Conservative. He retired from the Senate upon reaching the mandatory retirement age of 75 on November 10, 2008. On January 8, 2009, it was announced that Gustafson was appointed to the Privy Council on the advice of Prime Minister Stephen Harper.

Gustafson died on March 18, 2022, in Midale, Saskatchewan.

Electoral record

References

External links 
 

1933 births
2022 deaths
Canadian evangelicals
Canadian senators from Saskatchewan
Conservative Party of Canada senators
Members of the House of Commons of Canada from Saskatchewan
Progressive Conservative Party of Canada MPs
Progressive Conservative Party of Canada senators
Canadian people of Icelandic descent
21st-century Canadian politicians